The Australian Correspondence Chess Championship is organised by the Correspondence Chess League of Australia (CCLA). The event was held three times before 1937, with O Ludlow winning once and F M Hallman winning twice. Regular championships have been held since 1937 with a break from 1939 to 1945 due to World War II.

Australian Correspondence Chess Championship

1937 C.J.S. Purdy
1948 C.J.S. Purdy
1950 Romanas Arlauskas
1955 Max Salm
1959 Karlis Ozols, John Kellner
1961 John Kellner
1963 Lloyd Fell
1966 Alan Miller, Max Salm
1969 Clive Barnett
1972 Peter Thompson
1975 Michael Woodhams
1977 Irvis Venclovas, Greg Ware
1979 Norton Jacobi, Roy Weigand
1981 Kevin Harrison
1983 Simon Jenkinson
1985 Lloyd Fell
1987 Guy West
1989 Frank Hutchings
1991 Jose Silva
1993 Frank Hutchings
1995 Bill Jordan
1997 Clive Barnett Stewart Booth
1999 Mike Juradowitch
2001 Stewart Booth
2003 Gary Benson
2004 B. Oates
2005 Dr. Clive Barnett, John Paul Fenwick
2006 Dr. Clive Barnett
2007 Dr. E.B. Morgan
2008 John Paul Fenwick
2010 Simon W. Jenkinson
2012 Clive Murden
2013 Colin D. McKenzie
2014 Colin D. McKenzie
2015 Barrie Mulligan
2016 Richard Egelstaff
2017 Barrie Mulligan
2018 Joseph Tanti
2019 Barrie Mulligan
2020 Eric Staak
2021 Simon W. Jenkinson
2022 In progress

See also

References
The Correspondence Chess League of Australia
CCLA

Chess national championships
Correspondence Chess Championship